Edgar Eugene Fields (born March 10, 1954) is a former professional American football defensive tackle in the National Football League. He was drafted in the 3rd round (63rd overall) in the 1977 NFL Draft after playing college football for Texas A&M. He played five seasons for the Atlanta Falcons and the Detroit Lions.

1954 births
Living people
Players of American football from Austin, Texas
American football defensive tackles
Navarro Bulldogs football players
Texas A&M Aggies football players
Atlanta Falcons players
Detroit Lions players